On July 16, 2011, in Port St. Lucie, Florida, Blake Hadley, 54, and Mary-Jo Hadley, 47, were murdered by Tyler Hadley, their 17-year-old son. Three years later, he was convicted of the murder, and sentenced to life in prison.

Timeline

Murder
Tyler allegedly decided how he wanted to commit the murders a few weeks prior to committing them. He apparently told a friend exactly what he was planning to do at that time - noting that having a big party after a parricide had "never been done before." Shortly after noon Tyler wrote on his Facebook wall, "party at my crib tonight...maybe."

After Tyler's parents returned home that day, he hid their phones and locked their black labrador (who he suspected would defend his parents) in a closet.

Shortly before 5:00 p.m. on the evening of July 16, 2011, Tyler took three pills of ecstasy and then stood behind his mother, Mary-Jo, as she worked on her computer in the family room. He attacked his mother with the back-end of a claw hammer first. Hearing the screams, his father rushed out of the bedroom to see what was happening. Blake saw Tyler attacking his mother and froze at the sight. Tyler then fatally attacked his father with the hammer. After killing them, he dragged their bodies into the master bedroom and spent three hours cleaning up the blood and throwing household items that reminded him of them on top of their bodies.

Tyler first invited people to his party at 12:15 p.m. on the day of the murders, hours before he murdered his parents. He funded the party with his dead parents' credit cards (he was spotted by an ATM when his photo was taken as he pulled cash out of the accounts) and then picked up some friends. Around 60 people attended the party that night and several are alleged to have noticed "the smell of dead bodies".

During the party, Tyler apparently told several people about what he had done. Tyler went on a short walk with a friend, Michael Mandell, and confessed his crime to him. After returning to the party, Michael discovered the bodies of Blake and Mary-Jo in the master bedroom. Michael did not leave the party immediately. He continued to spend hours with Tyler and even took a selfie with him. Four hours later, he then left the party and called a local crime hotline to report the murders. News of the crime was then spread by word of mouth. Hadley was arrested early the next morning.

Perpetrator 
Tyler was 17 at the time of the murders. During his teenage years, Tyler began skipping school and taking drugs. His sentencing documents indicate he had been involved in myriad crimes prior to these murders. To wit, Tyler had participated in drug use, sales, and purchases and had been criminally detained for arson, vandalism, thefts, aggravated battery, and now murder (there was also a $15,000 civil suit pending after Tyler had hit and injured a child while driving his father's car in June 2010). Prior to the parricides, he had been enrolled in an out-patient drug treatment program (which was not working because he was not willing to stop using drugs). Knowing he would soon turn 18 - and desperate to get him help, his parents had recently found an in-patient treatment program for him - which was subsequently stated to be the motive for the murders; he did not want to be in the program - as per the resentencing documents.

Convictions
Because Tyler was a minor, he could not be sentenced to death by Florida law. In 2014, he was sentenced to life imprisonment without parole.  While in jail awaiting sentencing, Tyler had spent his time signing autographs for fellow inmates. He would take a news article about the murder and write, "It's Hammer Time" across the article and sign with his self-proclaimed nickname - Hammer Boy.

In April 2016, his sentencing was overturned by an appeal judge who stated the lower court "did not consider the correct alternative to a life sentence". Miller v. Alabama had just recently been handed down by the Supreme Court which changed how Juvenile Murderers were to be treated within the adjudicatory process. When sentencing occurred, the Judicial Review mechanism was not in place - and Tyler was entitled to having Judicial Review at some point in the future now that the law had evolved. Although the original judge had worked hard to meet the requirements of the new law during the Sentencing Hearing, the procedure had not yet been codified - so a new Sentencing Hearing would cure both of those defects and ensure Tyler received the justice due him.

In December 2018, Hadley was resentenced to life in prison, but this time the Judicial Review mechanism was properly put into place.

Hadley is imprisoned in the Okeechobee Correctional Institution.

Aftermath
In April 2015, the Hadley house was demolished.

References

2011 in Florida
2011 murders in the United States
American murder victims
Deaths by person in Florida
July 2011 crimes in the United States
Married couples
Murder committed by minors
Parricides
People murdered in Florida
Port St. Lucie, Florida
Violence in Florida
Hammer assaults